Naphtali is the sixth son of Jacob (and second son with Bilhah) in the Bible and the founder of the Israelite Tribe of Naphtali.

Naphtali, Naftali or Naftoli may also refer to:

Given name

Naftali
Naftali Bendavid, Congressional reporter for The Wall Street Journal
Naftali Bennett (born 1972), Israeli businessman and politician
Naftali Zvi Yehuda Berlin (1816–1893), Orthodox rabbi, dean of the Volozhin Yeshiva and author
Naftali Bezem (1924–2018), Israeli painter, muralist and sculptor
Naftali Blumenthal (1922–2022), Israeli politician
Naftali Bon (1945–2018), Kenyan track and field runner
Naftali Hertz ben Yaakov Elchanan, 17th century German rabbi, kabbalist and author
Naftali Feder (1920–2009), Israeli politician
Naftali Frankel, 16-year-old killed in the 2014 kidnapping and murder of Israeli teenagers
Naftaly Frenkel (1883–1960), GULAG creator
Naftali Halberstam (1931–2005), Grand Rebbe of Bobov
Naftali Herstik, Hungarian-Israeli chazzan (cantor) and teacher
Naftali Yehuda Horowitz, Bostoner Rebbe of Boston
Naftali Herz Imber (1856–1909), Jewish poet, Zionist and writer of the lyrics of the national anthem of Israel
Naftali Tzvi Labin of Ziditshov (c. 1916 – 2009), Zidichover Rebbe
Naftali Asher Yeshayahu Moscowitz, Melitzer Rebbe of Ashdod, Israel
Naftali Nilsen (1890–?), Norwegian newspaper editor and politician
Naftali Temu (1945–2003), Kenyan long-distance runner and Olympic gold medalist
Naftali Herz Tur-Sinai (1886–1973), Bible scholar, author and linguist instrumental in the revival of the Hebrew language as a modern, spoken language
Naftali Zvi of Ropshitz (1760–1827), rabbi and first Ropshitzer Rebbe

Naphtali
Naphtali Busnash (assassinated 1805), statesman and chief of the Algerian Jews
Naphtali Cohen (1649–1718), also known as Naphtali Katz, Russo-German rabbi and kabalist
Naphtali Daggett (1727–1780), American academic and educator, first professor of Yale University and later university president
Herz Cerfbeer of Medelsheim (1730–1793), Yiddish birth name Naphtali Ben Dov-Beer, French Jewish philanthropist
Naphtali Friedman (1863–1921), Jewish Lithuanian lawyer and politician in the Russian Empire and Lithuania
Naphtali Keller (1834–1865), Austrian Jewish scholar
Naphtali Tuli Kupferberg (1923–2010), American counterculture poet, author, cartoonist, pacifist anarchist, publisher and co-founder of the band The Fugs
Naphtali Lewis (1911–2005), American papyrologist and Egyptologist
Naphtali Luccock (1853–1916), American bishop of the Methodist Episcopal Church
Naphtali Hirsch Treves, kabbalist and scholar of the 16th century
Naphtali Hirz Wessely (1725–1805), German Jewish Hebraist, educator and advocate of reform

Naftoli
Naftoli Shapiro (1906–1981), Orthodox Talmudic scholar and rosh yeshiva in Glasgow, Scotland
Naftoli Trop (1871–1928), Talmudist and rosh yeshiva in Poland

Surname
ben Naphtali (first name in dispute), a rabbi and Masorete who flourished about 890–940 C.E.
Peretz Naftali (1888–1961), Zionist activist and Israeli politician
Timothy Naftali, director of the Richard Nixon Presidential Library and Museum

Jewish given names
Hebrew-language given names